Peter Atherton (29 June 1741 - 16 August 1799) was a British designer of instruments, an inventor, a manufacturer of textile machinery, and a cotton mill proprietor.

Career
Atherton was a successful instrument and engine maker, who also designed and manufactured innovative machinery for the textile machinery during the eighteenth century. 

The first spinning mill to rely solely on steam power were not a commercial success. However, the first successful designs have been attributed to Atherton; a Warrington machine builder who helped Sir Richard Arkwright whilst in his late twenties.

Atherton’s mills had 3,000 spindles and were powered by 30 horse power rotary engines. Like most entrepreneurs, he experienced early difficulties in recruiting capital. Initially he enlisted the help of William Harrison, a Manchester manufacturer, and later a J&T Hodgson, Liverpool merchants.

By 1787 his inventions relating to the automation of textile manufacturing techniques were becoming renowned on an international level. In 1787, the “Espiritu de los mejores diarios literarios que se publican en Europa“ of  Madrid, in Spain, reported Atherton’s latest invention, a revolutionary spinning machine:
 

Atherton invested in a number of enterprises. One of his companies, Atherton & Co became a leading manufacturer of cotton spinners, with locations in Warrington, Manchester and Liverpool. He was a co-proprietor of the Salford Engine Twist Company, in partnership with George Augustus Lee.
Atherton also owned a cotton mill in Chipping, Lancashire, Holyhead,  and had part ownership of another mill in Warrington. 

During the late 18th century there was a shortage of Royal Mint silver, so Atherton resorted to counter-marking foreign coinage to pay some of his senior textile employees. It is likely that it was merely to demonstrate a tradesman’s token. An example of his counter-marked coins are held at the British Museum. Only 3 coins are known to still exist.

Relationship with Richard Arkwright

To put this into historical context; the spinning frame was an Industrial Revolution invention for spinning thread or yarn from fibres such as wool or cotton in a mechanized way. It was developed in 18th-century Britain by Richard Arkwright and John Kay (a clockmaker). 

Atherton was approached in January 1768 by John Kay and Richard Arkwright (who at the time was an entrepreneur) for both financial, and technical assistance in creating a model of a spinning machine.

Atherton at first refused to conduct business with them,  owing to Arkwright's poverty stricken appearance, however he later relented and loaned two workmen to make the heavier parts of the machine. A working model was successfully produced and was patented in 1769 by Richard Arkwright.

Machinery patents
In July 1792, Atherton of Hunter Street, Liverpool registered a patent for a machine for twisting, winding and doubling silk, cotton and wool. This patent, # 1896, was issued just one month before Arkwright’s death.
 The original duration of the patent was for 14 years. However it is unknown as to whether it was renewed, by his estate since it was listed as an extant parent in 1856. Patent # 2036 was also for a machine for winding wool and cotton and was issued on 29 January 1795. 

Atherton’s Liverpool tax records from 1798 also record him trading from Hunter Street.

Personal
Atherton was born in Garston, Liverpool on 29 June 1741; the son of William Atherton (1717-1746) and Ann Tatlock. He married Bridget Foster at St Peter's Church, Liverpool on 29 November 1759.

It is likely that he descends from a Peter Atherton of Liverpool town bailiff in 1673), who was manufacturing half-penny tokens at this location in 1688 bearing a sugar loaf to represent his business.

Atherton continued working until his death. He died in Harrogate, on 16 August 1799, aged 60 years. He was buried at Christ Church, Harrogate on 20 August 1799. A few months after Atherton’s death, his cotton mills and machinery were advertised for sale.

His will is held by the National Library of Wales, Aberystwyth, Ref: C/1822/10 W (i

References

1799 deaths
19th-century English businesspeople
People of the Industrial Revolution
British textile industry businesspeople
English inventors
English clockmakers
Cotton industry in England
1741 births